The qualification phase of the 2015 African U-17 Championship decided the participating teams of the final tournament. A total of eight teams will play in the final tournament, to be hosted by Niger.

Qualification ties were played on a home-and-away two-legged basis. If the sides were level on aggregate after the second leg, the away goals rule was applied, and if still level, the tie proceeded directly to a penalty shoot-out (no extra time was played).

Player eligibility
During CAF Executive Committee meetings held on 21 and 22 September 2013, the CAF Medical Committee was instructed to continue the use of Magnetic resonance imaging (MRI) scans to determine the ages of players and consequently their eligibility to participate in the qualifying stages of the tournament. It was also directed to ensure the authenticity of the process as well as the identity of the players involved.

Teams
A total of 38 teams entered the qualification phase.

First round
The first legs were scheduled for 13–15 June 2014, and the second legs were scheduled for 27–29 June 2014.

|}

Notes

DR Congo won on default.

Togo won on default.

Guinea won on default.

Cameroon won on default.

Mozambique won 2–1 on aggregate.

Uganda won 5–1 on aggregate.

Egypt won 7–3 on aggregate.

Libya won on default.

South Sudan won on default.

Sierra Leone won on default.

Second round
The first legs were scheduled for 18–20 July 2014 (DR Congo vs Nigeria postponed to 26 July due to FIFA's suspension of Nigerian FA), and the second legs were scheduled for 1–3 August 2014.

|}

Notes

Nigeria won 5–0 on aggregate.

Gabon won 3–0 on aggregate.

1–1 on aggregate. Togo won on away goals.

Guinea won 3–1 on aggregate.

Ghana won on default.

Cameroon won 2–0 on aggregate.

Ivory Coast won on default.

Angola won 3–2 on aggregate.

Uganda won 7–2 on aggregate.

Zambia won 6–0 on aggregate.

Tunisia won on default.

Mali won on default.

1–1 on aggregate. Egypt won penalties.

South Africa won 4–0 on aggregate.

Third round
The first legs were scheduled for 12–14 September 2014, and the second legs were scheduled for 26–28 September 2014.

|}

Notes

Nigeria won 6–2 on aggregate.

Guinea won 4–0 on aggregate.

Cameroon won on default.

Ivory Coast won 4–1 on aggregate.

Zambia won 4–1 on aggregate.

Mali won 5–1 on aggregate.

South Africa won 4–3 on aggregate.

Qualified teams
 
 
 
 
  (hosts)

References

External links
 Under 17 Qualifiers, CAFonline.com

U-17 Championship qualification
Qualification
2015